Paul David Emblen (born 3 April 1976) is an English former professional footballer who played for Tonbridge Angels, Charlton Athletic, Brighton & Hove Albion and Wycombe Wanderers. His brother Neil was also a professional footballer.

References

External links

1976 births
Living people
English footballers
Footballers from Bromley
Charlton Athletic F.C. players
Brighton & Hove Albion F.C. players
Wycombe Wanderers F.C. players
Tonbridge Angels F.C. players
Association football midfielders